Four Mile Trail is a moderate to strenuous trail leading from Yosemite Valley to Glacier Point.

This trail is remarkable because it offers views of most of the Yosemite Valley landmarks. The trail begins at the base of the Sentinel Rock. The first four miles are  full of grand views of El Capitan and Yosemite Falls, as well as the Merced River as it runs through the valley. The second half of the trail provides several good views of Half Dome and Tenaya Canyon.

The trail becomes dangerous in winter conditions and is closed December through May, and the upper quarter of the trail (about a mile walk to the Glacier Point) remains extremely hazardous and is usually closed through May.  There is no potable water along the trail.

References 

Yosemite National Park
Hiking trails in California
Protected areas of Mariposa County, California